Zaeem Hasan Raja (Punjabi) (born 24 October 1956 in Lahore) is a former Pakistani cricketer who played for Service Industries, Lahore, Bahawalpur and Multan. His brothers, Wasim Raja and Rameez Raja played for Pakistan while his father, Saleem Akhtar, played first-class cricket.

References

External links
 
 Zaeem Raja at Pakistan Cricket Board

1956 births
Living people
Pakistani cricketers
Cricketers from Lahore
Service Industries cricketers
Lahore cricketers
Bahawalpur cricketers